Lamiez Holworthy (born 12 June 1992), is a South African DJ, television personality, radio presenter, record producer, businesswoman and philanthropist. She is best known for hosting the SABC 1 music show, Live AMP.

Early life and education
Lamiez Holworthy was born on June 12, 1992 in Eersterust, and grew up in Laudium. She attended Andrew Anthony Primary, then, Sunnyside Primary and later on, Kwaggasrand Primary. She also attended Pro Arte Alphen Park from grade 8 to 9. In 2009, she matriculated from Laudium secondary, and then went on to study media at the Boston media house in 2012.

Career
Lamiez started her career as an underground disc jockey while learning and mastering the art of mixing in 2010. She started her career in high school by guest presenting on a show called KMTV on Soweto TV and later emerged as the host for the South African lifestyle show Living The Dream which aired on Tshwane TV. She has revealed that she almost left the entertainment industry after an accident during her audition where her car was vandalized and her deejay equipment was stolen. After seven years, she landed her biggest role on SABC 1’s Live Amp.

She's known as the official full-time DJ for Sun City Resort and the official Miss South Africa DJ for the past two years. In April 2021, she became the co-host of the Metro FM dance show, Penthouse Session alongside South African DJ and presenter Lulo Cafe. In July 2021, she was the presenter of the 27th South African Music Awards.

Music
In August 2021, she released her debut single, "Sthokoze", which features the Lowkeys and Drip Gogo. Later that year she was nominated for Best Amapiano Female DJ Act at the South African Amapiano Awards.

Philanthropy
She started her own philanthropic foundation, the Lamiez Holworthy Foundation. The foundation provides aid for orphanages and safe houses for abused, abandoned HIV infected and affected children. The foundation also focusses on funding students from disadvantaged backgrounds with study materials, financial aid and sponsors.

In October 2021, she was honoured at the South African Heroines Awards for her philanthropic work.

Personal life
She is married to South Africa rapper Khuli Chana and is a step mother to Khuli's daughter who he had before their marriage.

Awards and nominations

References

Living people
1992 births
South African DJs
South African radio presenters
South African women radio presenters
South African record producers
Amapiano musicians
South African philanthropists
Women philanthropists
South African television personalities